"Fire on High" is the opening instrumental track from the 1975 Electric Light Orchestra (ELO) album Face the Music.

The song was the UK B-side to the band's worldwide hit single "Livin' Thing", issued in blue vinyl.  It was also later included — in an edited form minus the backwards vocals — as the flip side of the United States hit single "Sweet Talkin' Woman" in 1978.

Backmasking
The album version contains an opening with a backwards message; in reverse, a masked heavy voice (that of ELO drummer Bev Bevan) says, "The music is reversible, but time is not. Turn back! Turn back! Turn back! Turn back!". Ostensibly, this was Jeff Lynne's shot at backmasking hysteria, after satanic allegations were made against their song "Eldorado" by fundamentalist Christianity members. Snippets of Messiah by Handel can be heard during the album opening as well.

Despite being almost entirely instrumental, the song's title can be faintly heard near the end of the track by the chanting chorus. During the beginning of the song, the instrumental takes inspiration from the Dies irae.

Other uses
"Fire on High" was used as the opening theme for the CBS Sports Spectacular TV show in the mid-1970s. Currently, it is the opening and closing theme to "The Diner with Lou Simon," a weekly music-related talk show on SiriusXM Satellite Radio.

In 2000, The New Jersey Devils used the song, accompanied by visuals, in the opening ceremony for all their home games. Much of the song was also played prior to every Atlanta Thrashers home game.

A remix of "Fire on High" is played inside the "Astrosphere" at Funtown Splashtown USA in Saco, Maine. The attraction is a Scrambler ride inside a large dome.

References

Song recordings produced by Jeff Lynne
1975 songs
1970s instrumentals
Electric Light Orchestra songs
Rock instrumentals
Songs written by Jeff Lynne
CBS Sports Spectacular
Jet Records singles
United Artists Records singles